Brita Lucie Collett Paus (3 July 1917 Salsbruket, Norway – 28 June 1998, Oslo, Norway) was a Norwegian humanitarian leader and the founder of Fransiskushjelpen, a Catholic charitable organisation in Norway. She led the organisation from 1956 until 1993.

She converted to Catholicism from Lutheranism in 1950, and served as chair of the Laity Council of the Roman Catholic Diocese of Oslo, as board member of Caritas in Norway from 1965 and member of governmental committees.

She was married to orthopedic surgeon Bernhard Paus, the Grand Master of the Norwegian Order of Freemasons. Their daughter Lucie Paus Falck became a politician.

She was the daughter of landowner Axel Collett and Lucie Trozelli Krefting, and a member of the Collett family.

Honours
St. Hallvard Medal, 1975
Knight First Class of the Royal Norwegian Order of St. Olav, 1976
Pro Ecclesia et Pontifice, 1976
Grand Duchy of Luxembourg
Torstein Dale Memorial Prize (Norwegian Red Cross)
Rotary International's Paul Harris Fellow Award

References

Literature
''Maria Giæver: Fransiskushjelpen: Help, relieve, be present. Holm & Tangen Publishing, 2006.

Norwegian people of English descent
Norwegian Roman Catholics
Converts to Roman Catholicism from Lutheranism
Brita
Brita Collett
1917 births
1998 deaths